Heteroplocamus is a monotypic genus of sea slugs, specifically nudibranchs, shell-less marine gastropod molluscs in the family Polyceridae.

Species 
Species in the genus Heteroplocamus include:

 Heteroplocamus pacifica (Bergh, 1868)

References

Polyceridae